Jonathan Cardella is an entrepreneur and businessman, who is best known as Founder and Chairman of Ventive, named to the Inc. 5000 in 2018 - 2022, and Founder & CEO of its sister company, Strike Tax Advisory. He formerly owned Ski West, which was sold to Overstock.com and renamed Overstock Travel in 2005. He was retained as CEO of Overstock Travel. He also served as CIO of FixYa.
Jonathan also formerly founded and operated NeighborCity, as its CEO, which was an innovative real estate tech company that rated, ranked and recommended residential real estate agents to homebuyers and sellers. NorthstarMLS and Berkshire Hathaway Home Services sued NeighborCity and Cardella for allegedly violating copyright law by using Northstar MLS's and Berkshire Hathaways Home Service's real estate listing data without permission. The claims against Cardella were dismissed and all remaining claims were settled without admission of fault.NeighborCity's case was instrumental in paving the way for real estate startups and technology companies to safely utilize MLS data, while also bringing to light the alleged anti-competitive practices of the National Association of Realtors, Berkshire Hathaway Home Services, Nortstar MLS, and related MLSs.

References

American real estate businesspeople
Year of birth missing (living people)
Living people
American chief executives
Chief information officers